21st Century Breakdown is the eighth studio album by American rock band Green Day, released on May 15, 2009, through Reprise Records. Green Day commenced work on the record in January 2006 and forty-five songs were written by vocalist/guitarist Billie Joe Armstrong by October 2007, but the band members did not enter studio work until January 2008.

21st Century Breakdown is a concept album/rock opera much like their previous album American Idiot (2004). Armstrong has described the album as a "snapshot of the era in which we live as we question and try to make sense of the selfish manipulation going on around us, whether it be the government, religion, media or frankly any form of authority". The singles "Know Your Enemy" and "21 Guns" exemplify the themes of alienation and politically motivated anger present in the record.

To handle the record, they turned to producer Butch Vig, best known for producing Nirvana's Nevermind (1991). Critical response to 21st Century Breakdown was generally positive. The record achieved Green Day's best chart performance to date, reaching number one on the album charts of various countries, including the United States Billboard 200, the European Top 100 Albums, and the United Kingdom Albums Chart. The album won the Grammy Award for Best Rock Album at the 52nd Grammy Awards on January 31, 2010. As of December 2010, 21st Century Breakdown has sold 1,005,000 copies in the United States and more than 4 million worldwide.

Writing and recording
Green Day began to write new songs for what would become 21st Century Breakdown in January 2006 after touring extensively in 2005 in support of their seventh studio album American Idiot. At the time, frontman Billie Joe Armstrong stated: "We'll start with silence, and that's how we'll be able to find the inspiration to find another record." The band did not release any details of the writing and recording process until October 2007, when Armstrong said in an interview with Rolling Stone that he had written "something like 45 songs". The band members worked on the primitive conceptual stages of the album at their rehearsal studio in Oakland, California. Little was revealed on the themes or musical style of the album, but Armstrong stated: "I want to dig into who I am and what I'm feeling at this moment – which is middle-aged." He added that many of the 45 songs were written on piano instead of guitar.

Green Day began the recording process for 21st Century Breakdown in January 2008. Later that year, it was confirmed that the band worked with producer Butch Vig. The album was recorded with Vig throughout 2008 and into early 2009 at four locations in California: Ocean Way Recording in Hollywood, Studio 880 in Oakland, Jel Studios in Newport Beach, and Costa Mesa Studios in Costa Mesa. While recording in Hollywood, the band members bought cheap turntables from Amoeba Music and listened to many vinyl records for inspiration, including albums by The Beat and The Plimsouls. Armstrong cited as inspiration the music of The Kinks' Ray Davies, The Pretty Things' S.F. Sorrow, The Doors' The Doors and Strange Days, and Meat Loaf's Bat Out of Hell. Drummer Tré Cool noted the influence of Eddie Cochran and The Creation on Armstrong's writing.

While writing at his home studio, Armstrong worked on a cover of The Who's 1966 mini-opera "A Quick One, While He's Away"; Green Day recorded a full-band version of the song during the album sessions. Vig noted that frustrations would sometimes cause delays in the recording process for 21st Century Breakdown. Armstrong kept his lyrics closely guarded and intentionally mixed his demos so that the vocals were low in the mix and thus unintelligible to the other band members. It was not until late 2008 that he chose to share his words with Cool, Vig, and bassist Mike Dirnt by sitting down with them and reading the entire album's lyrics aloud in order. The band members made the finishing touches on the album in early April 2009 and claimed that its release would lead to a "kind of... post-partum depression".

Themes and composition

21st Century Breakdown continues the rock opera style of its predecessor, American Idiot. The album is set in Detroit, Michigan and is divided into three acts: "Heroes and Cons", "Charlatans and Saints", and "Horseshoes and Handgrenades". Its loose narrative follows a young couple named Christian and Gloria through the challenges present in the U.S. following the presidency of George W. Bush. Bassist Mike Dirnt has compared the relationships between the songs to those in Bruce Springsteen's Born to Run, saying that the themes are not as tightly interwoven as in a concept album, but that they are still connected. Many of the record's themes and lyrics are drawn from Armstrong's personal life and he sings in the first-person narrative style about abandonment and vengeance in "Before the Lobotomy", "Christian's Inferno", and "Peacemaker". Rolling Stone noted that the album is "the most personal, emotionally convulsive record Armstrong has ever written".

The title track's opening lyric "Born into Nixon, I was raised in hell" references Armstrong's birth year of 1972, while "We are the class of '13" references the fact that his eldest son, Joseph, would graduate from high school in 2013. Dirnt has expressed his belief that "Last of the American Girls" was written about Armstrong's wife Adrienne, who he claimed is steadfast in her beliefs and assertively defends them, as is the topic of the girl in the record. Armstrong has cited his "disconnected" childhood—he was raised by his five older siblings after their father's death, while their mother worked graveyard shifts as a waitress—as the roots of the discontent expressed on 21st Century Breakdown. "East Jesus Nowhere" rebukes fundamentalist religion and was written after Armstrong attended a church service where a friend's baby was baptized.

Musically, 21st Century Breakdown is similar to the punk rock style of American Idiot, but many critics have claimed that Green Day's traditional sound has evolved in the five years, with 21st Century Breakdown incorporating new influences such as heavier, louder pop rock and arena rock on an epic scale. Rob Sheffield of Rolling Stone indicated that the album provides ballads that are Green Day's most polished; he claimed that the band "combine punk-thrash with their newfound love of classic-rock grandiosity". MTV compared the material to that of classic rockers like The Who, while Spin called the title track "Green Day's most epic song yet". Cool has remarked: "It's important to us that we're still looked at as a punk band. It was our religion, our higher education". However, he also noted that Armstrong had delved into the past in writing 21st Century Breakdown, gleaning inspiration from the artists who shaped rock music. Armstrong himself has stated: "Ground zero for me is still punk rock. I like painting an ugly picture. I get something uplifting out of singing some of the most horrifying shit you can sing about. It's just my DNA."

With a running time of almost 70 minutes, 21st Century Breakdown is Green Day's longest album to date.

Critics have labeled 21st Century Breakdown as pop-punk, punk rock, power pop, arena rock, post-punk, alternative rock, and pop rock.

Promotion and release

Green Day commenced work on the record in January 2006. The writing and recording process spanned three years and four California recording studios, and it was finished in April 2009. On February 9, 2009, Green Day announced the album title and that the record would be split into three acts: "Heroes and Cons", "Charlatans and Saints", and "Horseshoes and Handgrenades". On March 17, a teaser trailer for 21st Century Breakdown was posted on the band's website. The international release date of May 15 was announced on March 25. In early April 2009, Green Day premiered "Know Your Enemy" on television; a portion of the song was used as introductory music to the 2009 NCAA men's basketball tournament championship game. The band first performed 21st Century Breakdown in full during a string of California club shows in April 2009. At each show, concertgoers were given programs containing all of the album's lyrics. The first single, "Know Your Enemy", was released on April 16, 2009, and soon after the world premiere of the song's music video occurred on April 24 on the MTV UK website.

21st Century Breakdown was released internationally on May 15, 2009, through Reprise Records. The special edition vinyl version was limited to 3,000 copies and consisted of three 10" records, one for each of the album's "acts", a CD copy of the album, a 60-page art booklet, and a code for the digital download of the full album. The album artwork process was led by Chris Bilheimer and is based on a work from artist Sixten, who confirmed that the couple on the cover were "just friends of a friend at a party in Eskilstuna, Sweden" and explained that a mutual friend snapped a picture of the pair kissing. He added: "I love their passion, and just had to make a stencil out of it to spread the love." The cover art was noted for a marked similarity with that of Blur's 2003 album Think Tank, itself a stencil by artist Banksy, except that one had the couple wearing diving helmets. Green Day showcased a collection of similarly themed art, called "The Art of Rock", at an art exhibition in London between October 23 and November 1, 2009. The "kissing couple" on the cover later was re-created in the music video for "21 Guns".

The record debuted at number one on the Billboard 200 in the U.S., where it sold 215,000 copies in its first week, which was a shortened three days. In its second week, 21st Century Breakdown moved an additional 166,000 copies, sliding to number 2. In its third week, it sold 76,000 copies. 21st Century Breakdown slid down to number five in its fourth week but achieved the coveted Gold status for sales of 500,000 copies in the same week. chart. The album remained at number one on the Billboard Top Rock Albums chart for three weeks. In the United Kingdom, the album debuted at #1, selling 79,770 copies in its first week and it has sold over 600,000 copies to date. In Canada, the album debuted at #1 on the Canadian Albums Chart, selling 30,000 copies in its first week. The album debuted at the top of sales charts in twenty four total countries, including a peak of number one on the European Top 100 Albums. 21st Century Breakdown was only released in a Parental Advisory version containing explicit lyrics and content; Walmart refuses to sell albums with a Parental Advisory sticker and requested that Green Day release a censored edition. The band members responded by stating: "There's nothing dirty about our record... They want artists to censor their records in order to be carried in there. We just said no. We've never done it before. You feel like you're in 1953 or something." The second single, "21 Guns", was released to radio stations on May 25. The band embarked on a world tour in July 2009; the North American leg lasted through September and the European leg ended in November. "East Jesus Nowhere" was released as the album's third single on October 19, 2009.

Critical reception

Reception to 21st Century Breakdown has been generally favorable, according to aggregating website Metacritic, which reported a rating of 70/100 based on 30 critical reviews.  Dan Silver of The Observer awarded the record four stars out of five and likened it to both Bruce Springsteen's music and the avant-garde writing of Chuck Palahniuk. Rolling Stones David Fricke called 21st Century Breakdown "a compound bomb of classic-rock ecstasy, no-mercy punk assault and pop-song wiles; it's like The Clash's London Calling, The Who's Quadrophenia and Hüsker Dü's Zen Arcade all compressed into 18 songs". Dan Cairns of The Times concluded: "Lyrically, it may succeed in capturing the contradictions, vulnerabilities and longing for harmony that thrum through Armstrong, Dirnt and Cool, their country, and humanity as a whole. But its real triumph, in an age of trimming, of market testing, of self-censorship and lowest common denominators, is not simply to aim insanely high, but to make it to the summit."

Criticism centered on the concept of the record; BBC's Chris Jones said that it is "griping vaguely against 'authority and that "too many buzz words obscure incisive meaning". Steve Kandell of Spin wrote that the humor of American Idiot was "sorely missed" and that the energy of the album seemed "directionless". The Guardians Alexis Petridis indicated that "the storyline becomes impossible to follow". Robert Christgau of MSN Music wrote that "I don't like right-wing Christianists either. But as every oppressed teen in the right-wing orbit knows full well, they're not as garbled and simplistic as Armstrong's anthems insist." Adam Downer of Sputnikmusic was the most critical professional reviewer of the album; he questioned the clarity of the lyrics by calling 21st Century Breakdown "more conceptually vague/ridiculous than American Idiot", and he went on to say that it "spirals out of control in its own heroic glory and never regains focus, thus ending with a product that Green Day couldn't afford to produce: an average record". Slant Magazine claims that "...an uncanny sense of familiarity hangs over too much of the album. The melodies of several tracks suggest ghosts of older Green Day songs." Kyle Ryan at The A.V. Club gave the album a B+, noting it as "going [even] bolder" than American Idiot. Ryan also declared "21st Century Breakdown reinforces what American Idiot first revealed: Green Day should never be underestimated."

Accolades

Album awards

Track listing

Personnel

Green Day
 Billie Joe Armstrong – lead vocals, guitar, piano
 Mike Dirnt – bass guitar, backing vocals, lead vocals on "Modern World" (section in "American Eulogy")
 Tré Cool – drums, percussion

Additional musicians
 Jason Freese – piano
 Tom Kitt – string arrangements
 Patrick Warren – string conducting

Production
 Butch Vig – producer
 Chris Lord-Alge – mix engineer
 Chris Dugan – engineer
 Keith Armstrong – assistant engineer
 Nik Karpen – assistant engineer
 Wesley Seidman – assistant engineer
 Brad Kobylczak – additional engineering
 Joe McGrath – additional engineering
 Andrew Schubert – additional engineering
 Brad Townshend – additional engineering
 Ted Jensen – mastering

Artwork
 Chris Bilheimer – design, photography, stencils
 Andrew Black – stencils
 Micah Chong – stencils
 David Cooper – stencils
 Marina Chavez – back cover photo

Release history

Charts

Weekly charts

Year-end charts

Certifications

Notes

References

External links

 21st Century Breakdown at YouTube (streamed copy where licensed)

2009 albums
Green Day albums
Albums produced by Butch Vig
Rock operas
Reprise Records albums
Grammy Award for Best Rock Album
Political music albums by American artists